Achladochori ("pear village"), older form Achladochorion (Αχλαδοχώριον) can refer to one of the following localities in Greece:

 Achladochori, Messenia
 Achladochori, Pella
 Achladochori, Serres
 Achladochori, Trikala